The Schluchhorn is a mountain in the Bernese Alps, overlooking Gsteig in the Bernese Oberland. The summit is located on the border between the cantons of Valais and Berne near the Sanetsch Pass.

References

External links
Schluchhorn on Hikr

Mountains of the Alps
Mountains of Switzerland
Mountains of Valais
Mountains of the canton of Bern
Bern–Valais border
Two-thousanders of Switzerland